Daniel Dutra da Silva (born 5 July 1988) is a professional tennis player from Brazil who competes mostly on the ATP Challenger Tour.

He reached his career high ATP ranking of world No. 207 in August 2022 and his career high in doubles of No. 240 in October 2022.

He has won 24 singles and 26 doubles Futures titles in his career.

In February 2009 he made his ATP debut at the 2009 Brasil Open in Costa do Sauipe as a qualifier.

Ranked No. 215, he qualified for his second ATP singles main draw at the 2022 Generali Open Kitzbühel as a lucky loser where he lost to wildcard Filip Misolic.

Biography
Daniel Dutra da Silva was born on July 5, 1988 in Sao Paulo, Brazil. He is now living in Balneário Camboriú.

He is the brother of former Brazilian tennis player Rogerio Dutra da Silva.

Career titles

Singles (25)

References

External links
 
 
 

1988 births
Living people
Brazilian male tennis players
Tennis players from São Paulo